Drogo of Sebourg (March 14, 1105– April 16, 1186), also known as Druon, Dreux, and Drogon, is a Flemish saint. He was born in Epinoy, County of Artois in the French part of the County of Flanders, and died in Sebourg, France. He is known as the patron saint of shepherds and coffee, and his feast day is on April 16.

Life
Saint Drogo was born of a noble family in Epinoy. He was a posthumous child, his father having died before he was born. His mother died in childbirth, leaving the newborn an orphan. He was raised by relatives. At the age of ten, he learned the circumstances of his birth, and it grieved him deeply. At twenty years of age, he distributed his money and goods among the poor, and renounced his estates in favour of the next heirs, to live a life of poverty and penance.

He then set out, and after having visited several holy places, hired himself shepherd to a wealthy woman named Elizabeth de la Haire, at Sebourg, two leagues from Valenciennes. The retirement and solitude were most agreeable to him, on account of the opportunities they made for prayer. Six years Drogo kept sheep, busying himself with practices of prayer and penance. He was a skilled shepherd who could read the weather and knew how to cure animals of their ills. He shared these skills with others. Despite his relative obscurity, his charity, and spirit of devotion and prayer, gained him the esteem and affection of everybody, particularly Elizabeth de la Haire. Many made him presents: but these he bestowed on the poor. It was rumored that he had the gift of bilocation and would be seen in the fields and in the church simultaneously. This gave rise to a common adage among the rural folk of that region, “I’m not Saint Drogo; I can’t ring the church bell for Mass and be in the procession!”

To avoid the danger of praise and admiration, at length he left his place, and went on pilgrimages. He is said to have journeyed to Rome nine times, as well as visiting the main shrines of France and Italy en route. From time to time he returned to Sebourg.

At length a hernia put an end to his pilgrimages, and he built himself a small cell against the wall of the church. The cell had a window for limited contact to receive food and water passed through by those seeking prayers and counsel. A second window opened into the church so he could follow the services. Here he lived as an anchorite for the space of forty-five years. He died A.D. 1186, at the age of eighty-one.

Veneration
"At Sebourg in Hainaut, around 1186, Saint Druon (Drogon). In search of a simple and solitary life, as a shepherd of flocks and then as a pilgrim, he lived for God alone." (Roman Martyrology) His feast day is April 16.

People from Epinoy claimed the body despite the protests of the residents of Sebourg, who wished to honor him as they had in life. However, the farther the cart carrying the body got from the church, the heavier the burden became until it could go no further. Taking this as a sign, Drogo was returned to the church. A cross marks the spot in Sebourg where the cart was forced to halt.

The relics of Saint Drogo (Druon) lie in the Church of Saint Martin in Sebourg. In 1609, Bishop Richardot formally recognized the cult of Saint Drogo by "raising the relics" to the altar, thus approving veneration. There is an annual procession with Drogo's relics in Sebourg each Trinity Sunday.

He is a patron saint of shepherds. After his death, people also prayed for his intercession for healing.

Controversy
Although Drogo is now regarded by some as the patron saint of coffee, this patronage is anachronistic. There is no evidence that a pilgrim from Flanders in the 12th century had any connection to a drink associated with Ethiopia and the Middle East in the 15th century. Mark Pendergrast states in "Uncommon Grounds: the History of Coffee and How It Transformed Our World" (2019), “Though Rhazes and Avicenna may have been writing about some form of coffee, they were not describing our brew. It probably wasn’t until sometime in the fifteenth century that someone roasted the beans, ground them and made an infusion.”

References

External links
Catholic.net - April 16 -- Saint Drogo
Saint Drogo Biography
 San Drogone
www.catholic.org entry on St. Drogo
 "Why is Saint Drogo of Sebourg, the Patron Saint of Coffee?"

12th-century Christian saints
1105 births
1186 deaths
Belgian Roman Catholic saints
Belgian hermits
Medieval French saints